Terry Malkin (born 20 September 1935, died 18 March 2010) was a British speed skater. He competed at the 1960 Winter Olympics and the 1964 Winter Olympics.

https://www.olympedia.org/athletes/92089

References

1935 births
Living people
British male speed skaters
Olympic speed skaters of Great Britain
Speed skaters at the 1960 Winter Olympics
Speed skaters at the 1964 Winter Olympics
People from Tadcaster